Rajkot is the fourth-largest city in the Indian state of Gujarat after Ahmedabad, Vadodara, and Surat, and is in the centre of the Saurashtra region of Gujarat. Rajkot is the 35th-largest metropolitan area in India, with a population of more than 2 million as of 2021. Rajkot is the 6th cleanest city of India, and it is the 7th fastest-growing city in the world as of March  2021. The city contains the administrative headquarters of the Rajkot District, 245 km from the state capital Gandhinagar, and is located on the banks of the Aji and Nyari rivers. Rajkot was the capital of the Saurashtra State from 15 April 1948 to 31 October 1956, before its merger with Bombay State on 1 November 1956. Rajkot was reincorporated into Gujarat State on 1 May 1960.

History

Rajkot has been under different rulers since it was founded. It has had a long history and had a significant influence in the Indian independence movement. Rajkot was home to many personalities like Mahatma Gandhi. Rajkot is in a transition period of growing cultural, industrial, and economical activities. Rajkot is the 26th largest city in India and the 22nd fastest-growing urban area in the world.

Rajkot was the capital of Saurashtra state from 15 April 1948 to 31 October 1956 before merging in bilingual Bombay State on 1 November 1956. Rajkot was merged into Gujarat State from bilingual Bombay state on 1 May 1960. Thakur Saheb Pradyumansinhji died in 1973. His son, Manoharsinhji Pradyumansinhji, has carved out a political career at the provincial level, succeeded him. He served as a Member of the Gujarat Legislative Assembly for several years and as the state Minister for Health and Finance. Monoharsinhji's son, Mandattasinh Jadeja has embarked on a business career.

On 26 January 2001 the 7.7  Gujarat earthquake shook Western India with a maximum Mercalli intensity of X (Extreme), leaving 13,805–20,023 dead and about 166,800 injured. This earthquake mainly affected the Kutch region of western Gujarat.

Geography

It has an average elevation of 128 metres (420 ft). The city is located on the bank of Aji River and Nyari River which remains dry except the monsoon months of July to September. The city is spread in the area of 170.00 km2.

Rajkot is situated in the region called Saurashtra in the Gujarat state of India. The significance of Rajkot's location is owing to the fact that it is one of the prime industrial centres of Gujarat. Rajkot has a central location in the area called the Kathiawar peninsula. The city is located within the Rajkot district in Gujarat. Rajkot city is the administrative headquarters of the district of Rajkot. The district is surrounded by Botad in the east, and Surendranagar in the north, Junagadh and Amreli in the south, Morbi in the northwest and Jamnagar in the west and Porbandar in the southwest.

Climate

One of the most important weather phenomena that is associated with the city of Rajkot is the cyclone. The cyclones generally occur in the Arabian Sea during the months after the rainy season. The region experiences a lot of rainfall and high-speed winds during the time of the year after the monsoon season as well as the months of May and June. However, June experiences lesser amount of rainfall and winds than the post-monsoon time. Thunderstorms are another important part of the Rajkot weather in the months of June and July. In the months of winter, Rajkot temperature varies between  but on a whole winters are pleasant.

Demographics
As of the 2011 Census of India, Rajkot recorded a total population of 1,390,640. Rajkot city has an average literacy rate of 82.20%, higher than the national average. The population is 52.43% male and 47.47% female. Most of the population is Hindu with a Muslim minority.

Culture

The people in Rajkot are predominantly vegetarians. The women of Rajkot are fond of jewellery. Large chains, pendants and other heavy gold jewellery are a common sight during marriages, festivals and functions. The attire changes with the season and festivals. The ladies normally wear Gujarati style Saree and men can be seen in flowing Kurtas and formal wear (shirts and trousers).

Rajkot is multicultural. One can find many languages, like Gujarati, Hindi, Urdu, English, Sindhi, Bengali, Tamil, Malayalam and Marathi.  However, only Gujarati, Hindi, Urdu, and English are well understood. Rajkot is the part of Kathiyawad. Because of this, people of Rajkot are also known as Kathiyawadi.

Rajkot is frequently referred to as Rangilu Rajkot (રંગીલુ રાજકોટ), meaning "Colourful Rajkot". Rajkot is also called as "Chitranagri" (City of Paintings).

Literature

Malcolm Pasley, renowned and highly respected scholar and translator of the works of Franz Kafka, was born in Rajkot.

Landmarks

Rajkot has many historical landmarks and places. The Jubilee Garden is a large, open park in the centre of the city featuring many monuments from colonial times. Located prominently in the centre of the garden is the Connaught Hall. Other notable points of interest near the garden include the historic Mohandas Gandhi High School (Now Mahatma Gandhi Museum), Kaba Gandhi No Delo (Mohandas Gandhi's childhood residence), Rashtriya Shala, Watson Museum, Rotary Dolls Museum, Lang Library, Rotary Midtown Library and Saurashtra Cricket Association Stadium.

The Rotary Dolls Museum has a collection of more than 1,400 dolls from all over the world. This museum is being managed by Rotary Club of Rajkot Midtown along with Rajkot Nagrik Sahakari Bank. The Museum has earned a place in Limca Book of Records for its unique collection of dolls.

The Lang Library and the G.T. Sheth Library collect thousands of documents and books covering every period in Rajkot and Saurashtra history. Rajkot has many other public libraries with many branches throughout the city. It includes Rotary Midtown of Rajkot City Library and many more.

Other points of interest in Rajkot include Darbargarh Haveli, Swaminarayan Gurukul, Masonic Hall, Race Course, Aji Dam, Swaminarayan Temple, Iskcon Temple, Vishwakarma Prabhuji Temple.

The Watson Museum, located in the Jubilee Garden, has a collection of human history and culture. It presents objects of the colonial period of India and the history of Rajkot. The Rajkot Memon Boarding is the headquarters of Muslim activities before 1947. Saurashtra Muslim league held many Muslim conventions at Rajkot Memon boarding ground.

The Gaibanshah Peer Dargah is the centre of conviction of people whether they are Muslims or Hindus. At Gaibanshah Peer Dargah there is a religious program called Ursus every year. In this program almost every year every religion's head comes and take part in this gathering to preach about peace and humanity.

The Trimandir, a non-sectarian temple founded by Dada Bhagwan, is located at a short distance from the city. AIIMS Rajkot's medical college is located in its temporary campus at PDU medical College in the Hospital chowk area of Rajkot.

The Rajkumar College, Rajkot was established in 1868 by the Princes and Chiefs of Kathiawar [currently Saurashtra region of Gujarat]. EDUCATION.

Awards 
Best LAW and Order city – 2013
Best Housing & Transport City- 2015
Safe City Award for Rajkot Eye-Way Project 2018
Best city for Women Safety- 2013
Best City Cleanliness and Sanitation- 2013
National Winner of WWF's One Planet City Challenge 2018
National Award For Implementation of Food Safety Act-2016

Performing arts 
Rajkot is a major regional centre for the arts, with many venues for the performing arts in the city. Hemu Gadhavi Natyagraha, one of the first non-profit regional theatres, is rich with history and dedicated to the Gujarati Play.

Music 
Rajkot has its own native music genre, called day, which is used to convey folk stories and sayings. Rajkot also inherited Kathiyawadi folk music. The city also has various orchestra groups, which perform professionally. They mainly perform music albums from Bollywood.

Sports

Cricket is the most popular sport in the city. One-day internationals, domestic tournaments such as the Ranji Trophy, the Duleep Trophy and many inter-school and collegiate tournaments are played at the Madhavrao Sindhia Cricket Ground.
The newly constructed 2nd International Cricket Stadium situated in Rajkot, Saurashtra Cricket Association Stadium, formerly known as Khandheri Cricket Stadium, is a cricket stadium in Khandheri, about 15 kilometers outside Rajkot, India. The Stadium has a capacity of 28,000 to 32,000 spectators. In this cricket stadium, Day/Night matches can now also be played. The stadium hosted its 1st International Cricket Match played on 11 January 2013 between India and England.
The stadium will part of a larger sports complex that will include venues for other sports such as badminton, basketball, and volleyball. It will host Saurashtra Cricket Association matches along with Madhavrao Sindhia Cricket Ground.
Rajkot has produced cricketers such as Karsan Ghavri and Cheteshwar Pujara who have been members of the Indian cricket team. Rajkot has many other cricket grounds around city, including Railway Cricket Ground and Rajkumar College South Ground. Apart from cricket, other sports such as hockey, association football, volleyball, badminton, tennis, table-tennis, chess, swimming, and squash are rapidly growing popular in the city. There has been a significant increase in recent years in the number of private sports clubs, gymkhanas, and gymnasiums. Kathiawar gymkhana, indoor stadium, and swimming pools of Rajkot Municipal Corporation are major sports clubs in the city. Recently, the Gujarat Hockey Team (Under 14) was assembled with all 16 players coming from Rajkot. A new modernized cricket ground is even under construction at the outskirts. There are numerous swimming pools too. Rajkot Municipal Corporation also owns a 9-hole golf course at Ishwaria. It is maintained by Green Meadows Golf Club.

In 2016 and 2017, a franchise from Rajkot played in Indian Premier League. The franchise was owned by Intex Technologies.

Cycling is a fast-growing sport in Rajkot. Members of "Rajkot Cycle Club" regularly ride BRMs which are timed events which stretch from 200 km to 1200 km.

Festivals
Garba is popular among both, men and women and is performed during the festival of Navratri. The dance starts before midnight and continues until dawn. Mata Ambe, who rides a lion, has a special reverential status with any highly religious Gujarati. The 'Janmastami Mela' is organised for five days at the Race Course grounds to celebrate Janmastami. Diwali is one of the most important festival and is usually a week long holiday. Rajkot Municipal Corporation arranges the annual Fireworks Show for the citizens of Rajkot during the Diwali festival. The festival of Eid is also celebrated by the Muslim population.
Holi is also celebrated with frolic and is widely enjoyed by most of the city folk. People also celebrate Uttarayan (Makar Sankranti) on 14 January by flying kites from their terraces.

Economy

The city contributes to the economy of the state with heavy and small scale industries under the patronage of Gujarat Industrial Development Corporation (GIDC) and Gujarat State Financial Corporation (GSFC). The economy of Rajkot was supported with a 280 million World Bank aid for development of infrastructure of the city. The plans are already in place to beautify and modernise the ancient city, including a Rock Garden, ala Chandigarh. Another 250 million project to rebuild the Kaiser-e-Hind, the only major bridge linking to the city, is already nearing completion.

Real estate
Real estate has been a key contributor to Rajkot's development in terms of economic and infrastructure development. Since early 2014, several high-rises have been built in Rajkot.

Industry
Products made in Rajkot include jewellery, silk embroidery and watch parts. Industrial products include bearings, diesel engines, kitchen knives and other cutting appliances, watch parts (cases and bracelets), automotive parts, forging industry, casting industry, machine tools, share market and software development. The city is also home to several CNC machine and auto parts manufacturers.

There are about 500 foundry units in Rajkot. The cluster came up mainly to cater to the casting requirements of the local diesel engine industry. The geographical spread of the cluster includes Aji Vasahat, Gondal Road, Bhavanagar Road areas, Shapar, Veraval and Metoda. The majority of foundry units in Rajkot produce grey iron castings for the domestic market. About 2% of the foundry units export castings such as electric motor castings and automobile castings.

Rajkot also houses Western Region Pipelines Headquarter of Indian Oil Corporation Limited (IOCL) near Gauridad village. Also natural gas industries like GSPL and GSPC are also present. A petroleum depot of IOCL is also present.

In the near future, the government of Gujarat will allocate large land areas for the development of Special Economic Zone which will be split into three areas and will include industries such as software and automobiles. As per recent market reviews, Rajkot is becoming Asia's biggest automobile zone.

Rajkot was formerly the leading centre in India in the field of diesel engine and submersible pumps. Submersible pumps are still manufactured in the city and marketed throughout India, with some of the larger manufacturers also exporting them.

Infrastructure

Rajkot Greenfield Smart City 
The city involves development of a Green Field Area covering approximately 930 acres of land with an estimated project cost of Rs 2100 cr. The project is envisaged to have world class, Smart physical infrastructure with utilities that are environment friendly, sustainable, functionally smart and technology driven.

Law and government
Rajkot is governed by many government bodies, including Jilla Seva Sadan (Rajkot District Collector Offices), Rajkot Municipal Corporation, Rajkot Urban Development Authority.

The city civic body has started a 24x7 call centre, the first of its kind in Gujarat and the second in the country to take care of all complaints relating to civic management. Citizens can now get all their complaints registered with the Rajkot Municipal Corporation by dialling a single number with an assurance that the problem would be addressed within 72 hours.

The Rajkot City Police are responsible for law enforcement and public safety in Rajkot, India. They are a subdivision of the state police force of Gujarat and are headed by a commissioner. The Rajkot police force is responsible for the protection and safety of Rajkot citizens.

Transport
Rajkot is connected to major Indian cities by air, railway and road.

Roads and highways

The Gujarat State Road Transport Corporation (GSRTC) runs regular buses to and from Rajkot to other cities of Gujarat. More than 81000 people travel daily with GSRTC. Rajkot is very well connected with Gujarat State Highways and Rajkot is allocated the vehicle registration code GJ-3 by RTO. There are a number of private bus operators connecting city with other cities of Gujarat state and other states of India.

Rail and internal transport

Rajkot has two railway stations. Rajkot Junction railway station (station code: RJT) is the more widely used railway station for passenger trains, and has services to all the major cities of India. Its elevation is 128 m above sea level. The other, smaller, railway station is Bhaktinagar Railway Station (station code: BKNG), served only by trains from Somnath, Veraval, Junagadh and Porbandar.

Rajkot Municipal Corporation has restored city bus services with Public Private Partnership in 2007. RMC and a private company is providing around 80 CNG buses under 15 to 20 routes in city and suburbs.

Recently Rajkot BRTS was launched on 1 October 2012. a new Bus rapid transit System (BRTS) with launching of the 10-km long Blue corridor and two AC buses which will be free for the first three months. The corridor is located in the west part of the city through the 150 ft ring road connecting Madhapar chokdi on the Jamangar road to Gondal chokdi on the Gondal road. The corridor will host 11 buses in further stage.

Rajkot BRTS Route
The fully completed project in future will have two more corridors – green and red from Arvind Maniyar Nagar to Saurashtra University and Greenland Chowk to Saurashtra University respectively involving 157 buses in three colours.
Rajkot thus becomes the second city in Gujarat to have BRTS after Ahmedabad. The city of Surat too is planning an ambitious BRTS project, construction of which is going on presently.

To make more ease in the public transport, a city bus service 'Rajkot Mass Transport Service (RMTS)' has also been added on 1 April 2015. Currently, it operates on 44 routes with 90 buses.

Rajkot has a large number of auto rickshaws, which operate around the clock within the city. Most of these are converted to CNG from petrol or diesel.

Aviation
Rajkot Airport is located at a short distance from the city and can be accessed by cab and auto rickshaw services. There are two daily flights to Mumbai, served by Air India. Spicejet started its services from Mumbai to Rajkot on 27 October 2019. Air India started the Rajkot New Delhi flight from 15 February 2015. One more daily flight from and to New Delhi has been started by Air India from 1 August 2019. Now the government had also made the decisions to built international airport in Rajkot namely Rajkot Greenfield Airport, at Hirasar, Gujarat which is currently under the construction. More flights are being added by SpiceJet and IndiGo airlines in 2021 to new destinations like Bangalore, Hyderabad and Goa.

Media and communications
State-owned All India Radio has a local station and has FM channel 102.4 Vividh Bharati in Rajkot which transmits various programs of mass interest.
Rajkot Also  has Private Local news Media  and Digital website.
Private FM stations like Radio Mirchi 98.3 FM, Red FM 93.5, Big 92.7 FM and 94.3 MY FM also serve the people of Rajkot with excellent entertainment and events.

Education

Rajkot is famous for providing education to Mahatma Gandhi (Gandhiji), at the Alfred High School. A number of schools in the city are run by Rajkot Municipal Corporation. They include 20 schools and learning centres, which consist of 3 elementary schools, 7 middle schools, 4 junior high schools, 4 senior high schools, 1 education centre, and 1 special school. There are also some self-financed public schools. There are two schools offering international curriculum: The Northstar School, which offers Cambridge Assessment International Education and The Galaxy School (TGS) which offers the International Baccalaureate Program. Rajkot is home to Rajkumar College, Rajkot, also known as RKC, which is one of the oldest schools of India. RKC is the oldest of the Chiefs' schools of India similar to Mayo College at Ajmer and Daly College at Indore where royals used to study. RKC was specially established for the princes of Kathiawar. Saint Paul is also a renowned school affiliated to ICSE curriculum.

Rajkot also has the Union Government HRD Ministry run Jawahar Navodaya Vidyalaya. It was started at the Juni Khadki school premise of Sir Lakhajiraj High School and later moved to its own building on the Jamnagar Road. It is a CBSE Board affiliated, residential school for girls and boys, providing education to those selected at the Class VI level all India entrance test.

The city is home to Saurashtra University, several colleges, and other institutions of higher education, both public and private. Rajkot has three private universities, RK University (RKU), Atmiya University and Marwadi University. The city has 12 engineering colleges. It has a Performing Arts College (Vocal, Classical dance, Tabla Vadan etc.) opposite Hemu Gadhvi Natya Gruh. The Saurashtra University is the city's public university.

AIIMS Rajkot, an AIIMS institute has started its medical college with its inaugural batch of MBBS Students in December 2020.

See also 
List of cities in India
List of million-plus cities in India
List of most populous cities in India
List of most populous metropolitan areas in India
List of twin towns and sister cities in India
Status of Indian cities

References

Further reading

External links

 Rajkot Municipal Corporation (RMC)
 Rajkot Urban Development Authority (RUDA)
 
 

 
Metropolitan cities in India
Former capital cities in India